Church of Holy Trinity is a Pre-Romanesque style Roman Catholic church located in Split, Croatia. Out of all early-medieval (old Croatian) architectural monuments in Dalmatia, which historians date back to the period between 8th and 11th century, Church of Holy Trinity, with its original shape and rich findings, has a very important place. This small central edifice with six-leaf structure of semicircular arches strung around irregular circle has become one of the most precious heritage monuments of Split and Dalmatia.

Church of the Holy Trinity has been added to the register of the most valuable Croatian Cultural Heritage, of the highest category. The church is still in active use with Holy Mass being celebrated every Sunday at 8:30 am, except in the summertime (from June 13 to September 1).

History
Church of Holy Trinity was first mentioned in a list of countries which had Benedictine monasteries from 1060, which doesn't mean that the church wasn't built in the 9th century. Historians cite different dates of construction of this church; Iveković holds that it was built in the 6th century and Ljubo Karaman in the 11th century, but most historians believe that it was built in the 9th century.

English architect Thomas Graham Jackson, while studying the old architecture of Dalmatia, was first warned of the exceptional heritage value of this edifice, although it was founded abandoned and partially demolished in 1887. In 1891, investigations by domestic and foreign experts were conducted on the site. In 1914 the company from Bihać rented the church. In 1924, walls on the northwestern apse were renovated, while the previously walled up windows were opened in the 1950s. During restoration works in 1948, the remains of an older edifice that extends to the east, and more fragments of the altar partition were found. Findings are today kept in Archaeological Museum in Split. Arches and altar screen are a typical example of pre-Romanesque stone sculpture which is harmoniously decorated with the geometric Croatian interlace motifs and carved text.

In 1965, the walls and vaults of the church were cracked, and both interior and exterior neglected, with thorns growing in the interior. Therefore, the head of a monastery of the Assumption of Mary from Poljud neighborhood in Split, fra Vjekoslav Bonifačić, asked the authorities to renovate the church, which they eventually did. On October 22, 1967, church become founding place of newly founded parish of the Holy Trinity. The nearby monastery of the Assumption of Mary is used as a parish church because of practical reasons.

Description
Church has a central shape which is dominated by a dome that lies on six apses interconnected with pillars. The church is only of all six-apse edifices in the early medieval architecture of Dalmatia that is located in Split (the others are in the Zadar area). In addition, it's also the best preserved. The maximum external length of the church is 10.30 meters, a minimum internal length 5.90 meters, while the height of the central tambour is  9.5 meters. The church is built of limestone drowned in plaster and vaulted with a semi-dome, probably taken from some older buildings in the area.

Remains of an ancient edifice with an apse that had an unknown purpose were found nearby.

References

Churches in Croatia
Medieval architecture
9th-century establishments in Croatia
Buildings and structures in Split, Croatia
Tourist attractions in Split